The Kiribati ambassador in Beijing is the official representative of the Government in Tarawa to the Government of China.

List of representatives

Sino-Pacific relations#Kiribati
China–Kiribati relations

References 

 
 
Taiwan
Kiribati
Lists of ambassadors to Taiwan